Hartley is a village one mile southwest of Cranbrook in Kent, England. The only retailer in the area is a local farmshop, which has a cafe and fishmongers. Hartley lies on the A229.

Hartley Badgers are the local football team. Traditionally, only Hartley natives are eligible for selection- in a policy similar to that of Athletic Bilbao. They share the hosting of the annual grudge match against their fierce rivals, Gills Green Gulls. It is a historically hotly contested fixture, with three hospitalisations from crowd trouble in the last ten years.

References

 

Villages in Kent
Cranbrook, Kent